Battle of Nauplia or Siege of Nauplia can refer to one of the following military engagements that took place at or near the port city of Nauplia (Nafplio) in Greece:
 Siege of Nauplia (1205–12) by the Crusaders
 Siege of Nauplia (1686) by the Venetians
 Siege of Nauplia (1715) by the Ottomans
 Battle of Nauplia (1770), between the Russian and Ottoman fleets
 Siege of Nauplia (1821–22) by the Greeks
 Battle of Nauplia (1822), between the Greek and Ottoman fleets

History of Nafplion